Ranaghat district is a proposed district in presidency division, West Bengal. The district will be formed by dividing the Nadia district. The name of the district is yet to be finalized.

History 
On 1 August 2022, Chief Minister of West Bengal Mamata Banerjee declared about the creation of Ranaghat district carving out from Nadia district. The announcement to carve a Ranaghat district out of the existing Nadia district triggered large protests with many common people and intellectuals complaining that the new administrative area would take away their rich culture and heritage associated with Nadia. Sources at Nabanna said the government was considering the possibility of naming of new district as South Nadia, instead of Ranaghat.

Education

College
 Ranaghat College
 Santipur College
 Pritilata Waddedar Mahavidyalaya
 Srikrishna College

Health facilities 
Two main hospitals of Ranaghat district is Ranaghat Subdivisional Hospital, and Santipur State General Hospital. Ranaghat Subdivisional Hospital consists of 171 beds and Santipur State General Hospital consists of 131 beds. Besides, this district has three rural hospitals with 30 beds each: Bagula Rural Hospital, Habibpur (Jadhav Dutta) Rural Hospital, and Aranghata Rural Hospital.

References

Proposed districts of West Bengal